Saltora Dr.BC. Vidyapith is a school in Saltora, Bankura, West Bengal, India. It was established in 1962.

The school has the facilities of Upper Primary Education(5-8), Secondary(9-10) and Higher Secondary (11-12) with two stages Arts and Science. As of January, 2020, it has 29 teachers and 7 non-teaching staff.

Subjects

Higher Secondary Subjects : 
1. Bengali
2. English
3. Sanskrit
4. Philosophy
5. History
6. Geography
7. Political Science
8. Physics
9. Chemistry
10. Biology
11. Mathematics

References 

High schools and secondary schools in West Bengal
Schools in Bankura district
Educational institutions established in 1947
1947 establishments in India